Yankee Run is a tributary of Rapid Run in Centre County, Pennsylvania, in the United States. It is a small stream and is named after Benjamin Strawbridge. Wild trout naturally reproduce within it.

Course
Yankee Run begins in a valley in a mountain in Miles Township. It flows west-southwest through the valley for several tenths of a mile before turning south. The stream receives a very short unnamed tributary from the right and enters a much larger valley, where it crosses Pennsylvania Route 192. A short distance further downstream, it reaches its confluence with Rapid Run.

Tributaries
Yankee Run has no named tributaries.

Geography and geology

Yankee Run is located to the south of McCall Mountain and to the east of Hough Mountain. The stream is located near the Brush Valley Narrows. It was described in John Blair Linn's book History of Centre and Clinton Counties as a "little stream".

Watershed and biology
The stream is entirely within the United States Geological Survey quadrangle of Hartleton.

Wild trout naturally reproduce in Yankee Run from its headwaters downstream to its mouth. Additionally, its unnamed tributary is being considered for wild trout designation.

History
Yankee Run was entered into the Geographic Names Information System on August 2, 1979. Its identifier in the Geographic Names Information System is 1191857. Rapid Run, which Yankee Run is a tributary of, is also known as Yankee Run in some sources.

Benjamin Strawbridge, an early settler in the Brush Valley, settled in the vicinity of Yankee Run after inhabiting a number of places in the valley. The stream is named after Strawbridge, who, is described as a Yankee in John Blair Linn's book History of Centre and Clinton Counties.

The unnamed tributary to Yankee Run was surveyed by the Pennsylvania Fish and Boat Commission on July 16, 2013.

See also
Halfway Run, next tributary of Rapid Run going downstream
List of rivers of Pennsylvania

References

Rivers of Centre County, Pennsylvania
Tributaries of Buffalo Creek (West Branch Susquehanna River)
Rivers of Pennsylvania